Martyn Brown (born 21 June 1953) is a male former diver who competed for Great Britain and England.

Diving career
Brown represented Great Britain at the 1976 Summer Olympics and the 1980 Summer Olympics.

He also represented England in the 10 metres platform, at the 1974 British Commonwealth Games in Christchurch, New Zealand. Four years later he competed again for England in both the platform and springboard events, at the 1978 Commonwealth Games in Edmonton, Alberta, Canada.

References

External links 
 

1953 births
English male divers
Divers at the 1974 British Commonwealth Games
Divers at the 1978 Commonwealth Games
Living people
Olympic divers of Great Britain
Divers at the 1976 Summer Olympics
Divers at the 1980 Summer Olympics
Commonwealth Games competitors for England